Crash Course (sometimes stylized as CrashCourse) is an educational YouTube channel started by John Green and Hank Green (collectively the Green brothers), who first rose to fame on the YouTube platform through their Vlogbrothers channel.

Crash Course was one of the hundred initial channels funded by YouTube's $100 million original channel initiative. The channel launched with John and Hank presenting their respective World History and Biology series; the early history of the channel continued the trend of John and Hank presenting humanities and science courses, respectively. In November 2014, Hank announced a partnership with PBS Digital Studios, which would allow the channel to produce more courses. As a result, multiple additional hosts joined the show to increase the number of concurrent series.

To date, there are 44 main series of Crash Course, of which John has hosted nine and Hank has hosted seven. Together with Emily Graslie, they also co-hosted Big History. A second channel, Crash Course Kids, is hosted by Sabrina Cruz and has completed its first series, Science. The first foreign-language course, an Arabic reworking of the original World History series, is hosted by Yasser Abumuailek. The main channel has also begun a series of shorter animated episodes, called Recess, that focus on topics from the previous Crash Course series. A collaboration with Arizona State University titled Study Hall began in 2020, which includes less structured learning in its topics. In 2022, a series called Office Hours began, in which hosts of previous Crash Course series and professors host a livestream and answer viewer questions. In 2023, Crash Course launched a companion channel, Crash Course en Español.

History and funding

YouTube-funded and Subbable periods (2011–2014)

The Crash Course YouTube channel was conceived by the Green Brothers after YouTube approached them with an opportunity to launch one of the initial YouTube-funded channels as part of the platform's original channel initiative. The channel was teased in December 2011, and then launched on January 26, 2012, with the first episode of its World History series, hosted by John Green. The episode covered the Agricultural Revolution, and a new episode aired on YouTube every Thursday through November 9, 2012. Hank Green's first series, Crash Course Biology, then launched on January 30, 2012, with its first episode covering carbon. A new episode aired on YouTube every Monday until October 22 of that year. The brothers would then go on to end 2012 with two shorter series, with John and Hank teaching English literature and ecology, respectively.

Following their launch year, John and Hank returned in 2013 with U.S. History and Chemistry, respectively. However, that April, John detailed that Crash Course was going through financial hardships; in July, Hank uploaded a video titled "A Chat with YouTube", in which he expressed his frustration with the ways YouTube had been changing and controlling its website. Eventually, YouTube's original channel initiative funding ran out, and shortly after Hank's video, the Green brothers decided to launch Subbable, a crowdfunding website where viewers could donate monthly to channels in exchange for perks. On launching Subbable, Hank Green stated: "We ascribe to the idealistic notion that audiences don't pay for things because they have to[,] but because they care about the stuff that they love and want it to continue to grow". Crash Course was the first channel to be offered on Subbable, and for a time the website crowdfunded the channel. In March 2015, Subbable was acquired by Patreon, and Crash Course's crowdfunding moved over as part of the acquisition.

In May 2014, John mentioned an upcoming 10-episode Crash Course season on Big History, funded by a grant from one of Bill Gates's organizations. The series outlined the history of existence, from the Big Bang forward into the evolution of life. Both Green brothers hosted the series, with Emily Graslie also participating as a guest host.

Partnership with PBS Digital Studios (2014–2017)

In 2014, Crash Course announced a partnership with PBS Digital Studios, which began in 2015 with the Astronomy and U.S. Government and Politics series. In addition to funding the channel itself, the partnership also entails PBS Digital Studios helping Crash Course to receive sponsorships. As a result of the partnership as well as John commencing a year-long hiatus from the show in 2015, additional hosts were added to increase the number of concurrent series. Though the partnership meant PBS Digital Studios would assist with the production of Crash Course, the channel continued to receive funding from its audience through Patreon. In April 2015, The Guardian reported that Crash Course received $25,900 per month through Patreon donations. Aside from the new series on the main channel, Crash Course Kids was launched in February on a new Crash Course Kids channel. The series was hosted by Sabrina Cruz, known on YouTube as NerdyAndQuirky.

On October 12, 2016, the Crash Course YouTube channel uploaded a preview for Crash Course Human Geography. Hosted by Miriam Nielsen, the course was to discuss "what Human Geography isn't, and what it is, and discuss humans in the context of their world." Two episodes were posted during each of the following two weeks; however, the videos were removed on October 27, with John Green stating on Twitter that "...we got important things wrong. We'll rework the series... And we'll bring a better series to you in a few months." On October 31, John further explained that the videos were removed due to "factual mistakes as well as too strident a tone," and that the mishap was caused by a rushed production stemming from a lack of staffing and budgeting. The following October, during an "Ask Me Anything" (AMA) session on Reddit, John indicated the course may not return for some time, noting that "we don't feel like we've cracked it yet." The channel would go on to launch their Geography course in November 2020, intended to cover both physical and human geography over its run.

In 2017, Crash Course launched three film-related series: one covered film history, another film production, and the last of which covered film criticism. Also in 2017, Thomas Frank began hosting Crash Course Study Skills, which covered topics such as productivity skills, time management, and note-taking.

Complexly branding and YouTube Learning Fund (2018–2019)

Starting with the Statistics course in early 2018, Crash Course series that are not PBS co-productions began to directly identify as Complexly productions. Also that year, Crash Course launched an Arabic-language edition of World History hosted by Yasser Abumuailek and produced by Deutsche Welle (DW), which was uploaded to DW's Arabic YouTube channel. In July 2018, YouTube announced its YouTube Learning initiative, dedicated to supporting educational content on the platform. A few months later, as $20 million was invested into expanding the initiative, Crash Course secured additional funding via the initiative's Learning Fund program. However, PBS Digital Studios remained one of the primary sources of funding Crash Course, and the network also continued to help in finding sponsorships for the show.
 
The channel surpassed 1 billion video views in February 2019. In July, YouTube launched Learning Playlists as a continuation of their Learning Fund initiative; while videos in Learning Playlists notably lack recommended videos attached to them, in contrast to videos included in regular playlists on YouTube, they also include organizational features such as chapters around key concepts and lessons ordered by difficulty. After Learning Playlists' launch, Crash Course video content was formatted into several of these playlists. The channel reached 10 million subscribers in November 2019.

Partnership with Arizona State University (2020–present)
A collaboration with Arizona State University (ASU) titled Study Hall was announced in March 2020, which includes less structured learning in its topics. It was hosted by ASU alumni and advised by their faculty, with episodes posted on the university's YouTube channel but production and visual design by Complexly in the Crash Course style. The partnership was renewed in 2022, with two new series premiering: Fast Guides is appearing on a new dedicated Study Hall channel, focusing on showing what students can expect to study in a given major; and How to College on the main Crash Course channel, showing the process of choosing, applying for, and starting at a given institution.

In January 2023, Crash Course announced that they would be offering college courses on YouTube, in continued partnership with ASU and Google. Students would then have the option to spend $400 to receive college credit for the course that would be transferable to any institution that accepts ASU credits.

Production
In an interview with Entrepreneur, Crash Course producer and Sociology host Nicole Sweeney detailed:

Every year we have a big pitch meeting to determine what courses and things we're going to do the next year. In that meeting, we talk about a number of different things, but the rising question that motivates that meeting and then down the line as we're making decisions about what we're doing is what we think would be most useful for people.

To make its content as useful as possible to viewers, the Crash Course channel hires experts relating to the topics of its series to work on the show. The Missoula-filmed series are produced and edited by Nicholas Jenkins, while Blake de Pastino serves as script editor. The Indianapolis-filmed series is produced and edited by Stan Muller, Mark Olsen, and Brandon Brungard. Script editing is credited to Meredith Danko, Jason Weidner composes music for the series, and Sweeney serves as a producer, editor, and director for Crash Course. Raoul Meyer, an AP World History teacher and Green's former teacher at Indian Springs School, wrote the World History series, with John providing revisions and additions. Sweeney has said that she and the respective host go over each script after it is edited to assess it for content.

Sweeney also stated that each ten-minute episode takes about an hour to film. The Philosophy series and all series relating to science (with the exception of Computer Science) were filmed in a studio building in Missoula, Montana that also houses SciShow. The Biology and Ecology series were filmed in front of green screen, but from the Chemistry season onward, each series was filmed on new custom-built sets. The Computer Science series and all series on the humanities (excepting Philosophy and Economics) were filmed in a studio in Indianapolis, Indiana. In addition, Economics was filmed at the YouTube Space in Los Angeles, while Crash Course Kids was filmed in a studio in Toronto, Ontario. Crash Course Kids was directed by Michael Aranda and produced by the Missoula Crash Course team.

Once filmed, an episode goes through a preliminary edit before it is handed off to the channel's graphic contractor. Graphic design for all of the series except Biology and Ecology is provided by Thought Café (formerly Thought Bubble), and the sound design and music for these series are provided by Michael Aranda (and in later series, his company Synema Studios).

Formats
Crash Course video series feature various formats depending on the host's presentation style as well as the subject of the course. However, throughout all series, the show's host will progressively elaborate on the topic(s) presented at the beginning of the video. Early on in the history of the show, the Green Brothers began to employ an edutainment style for episodes of Crash Course, using humor to blend entertainment together with the educational content.

The World History series featured recurring segments such as the "Open Letter," where Green reads an open letter to a historical figure, period, item, or concept. Occasionally he converses with a naïve, younger version of himself whom he calls "Me from the Past"; this character usually has naïve or obvious questions or statements about the topic of the video. A running joke throughout the series is that the Mongols are a major exception to most sweeping generalizations in world history, noted by the phrase "Wait for it... the Mongols". Mentions of this fact cue the "Mongoltage" (a portmanteau of "Mongol" and "montage"), which shows a drawing of Mongols shouting "We're the exception!" followed by a three-second clip of a scene from the 1963 film Hercules Against the Mongols depicting a village raid. Green also frequently encouraged his viewers to avoid looking at history through Eurocentric or "Great Man" lenses, but instead to be conscious of a broader historical context.

For U.S. History, Green followed the tone set by World History and put an emphasis on maintaining an open, non-Western view of American History. In addition, the "Open Letter" was replaced by a new segment called the "Mystery Document", in which Green would take a manuscript from the fireplace's secret compartment and read it aloud, followed by him guessing its author and the source work it is excerpted from. If incorrect, he would be punished by a shock pen. While the Mongoltage was largely absent, mentions of America's national pride during the series would cue a new "Libertage", which consisted of photos associated with America atop an American flag, with a guitar riff and an explosion at the start and end of the montage, respectively.

The Biology program featured the recurring segment "Biolo-graphy," during which Hank relayed a short biography of someone who was associated with the topic of the episode. Additionally, at the conclusion of each episode, Hank provided YouTube annotations with links to every subtopic he explained within the video. He also noted that the successor series to Biology, Crash Course Ecology, would follow in the spirit of the former series.

Other releases
DVD box sets of the complete run of the Biology series and of season 1 of World History were made available for pre-order on October 31, 2013. In June 2016, the show's official site launched, providing free offline downloads of all episodes of every series completed to date. In May 2020, an official mobile app launched, providing easy access to all of the courses' video content along with rolling out flashcard and quiz study aides for particular courses.

The series was also made available for streaming on Curiosity Stream.

Series overview

Main series

Kids series

Foreign language series

Miniseries

Study Hall series
A partnership with Arizona State University and hosted on the Study Hall channel.

Office Hours series

Reception
The Crash Course project has been successful in its reach, with World History alone having attracted millions of viewers. It had a particular appeal to American students taking the AP World History class and exam; many students and teachers use the videos to supplement their courses.

Awards and nominations

References

Footnotes

External links
 
 

2010s YouTube series
2012 web series debuts
2020s YouTube series
Arizona State University
Big History
DFTBA Records creators
Education-related YouTube channels
English-language YouTube channels
Mass media in Indianapolis
Mass media in Los Angeles
Mass media in Missoula, Montana
Mass media in Toronto
Nerd culture
American non-fiction web series
Patreon creators
PBS Digital Studios shows
Science-related YouTube channels
Works by the Green brothers
YouTube-funded channels
YouTube channels launched in 2012